The Lonfit River is a river in the United States territory of Guam. It empties into the Pago River. Contaminants from the Ordot Dump in Chalan Pago-Ordot, Guam, which was closed in 2011, leached into the river.

See also
List of rivers of Guam

References

Rivers of Guam